The Germany men's national 3x3 basketball team for men is the basketball side that represents Germany in international 3x3 (3 against 3) competitions. It is organized and run by the German Basketball Federation.

World Cup record

Head coach position
 Matthias Weber – (2021)

See also
 Germany women's national 3x3 team
 Germany men's national basketball team

References

External links
 

3x3
Men's national 3x3 basketball teams